Porter Gustin (born February 8, 1997) is an American football defensive end who is a free agent. He played college football at USC.

Professional career

New Orleans Saints
Gustin was signed by the New Orleans Saints as an undrafted free agent following the 2019 NFL Draft. He was waived on August 31, 2019.

Cleveland Browns
On November 4, 2019, Gustin was signed to the Cleveland Browns practice squad. He was promoted to the active roster on November 22, 2019.

Gustin was placed on the reserve/COVID-19 list by the team on November 26, 2020, and activated on December 8. In the Wild Card round of the playoffs against the Pittsburgh Steelers, Gustin intercepted a pass thrown by Ben Roethlisberger during the 48–37 win.

Gustin was given an exclusive-rights free agent tender by the Browns on March 5, 2021. He signed the one-year contract on April 15. Gustin was waived by the Browns on August 31, 2021. Gustin was re-signed to the Browns' practice squad on September 1, 2021. The Browns elevated Gustin to their active roster on November 20, 2021, and again on December 18.. He was signed to the Browns' active roster on December 21, 2021.

Miami Dolphins
The Miami Dolphins signed Gustin on June 8, 2022. He was waived by the Dolphins on August 30, 2022, and re-signed to the practice squad.

References

External links
Cleveland Browns bio
USC Trojans bio

1997 births
Living people
American football defensive ends
American football linebackers
USC Trojans football players
Cleveland Browns players
Miami Dolphins players